Yacine Aït-Sahalia (born 1966) is the Otto Hack 1903 Professor of Finance and Economics at Princeton University. His primary area of research is financial econometrics. He has been serving as the inaugural director of the Bendheim Center for Finance at Princeton University from 1998 until 2014. Prior to that, he was an Assistant Professor (1993–96), Associate Professor (1996–98) and Professor of Finance (1998) at the University of Chicago Booth School of Business.

He received his undergraduate degree from École Polytechnique in Paris, France in 1987, his Master's degree from ENSAE ParisTech  in 1989, and received his Ph.D. in Economics from the Massachusetts Institute of Technology  in 1993.

He has served as Editor of the Review of Financial Studies (2003–2006), Co-Managing Editor of the Journal of Econometrics (2012-2018), and Associate Editor of the Annals of Statistics (2003–2006), Econometrica (2007–2013), the Journal of Finance (2007–2010), Finance and Stochastics (1996–2011), the Journal of Econometrics (1999–2012) and the Journal of Financial Econometrics (2001–2011). He served as Director of the Western Finance Association (2003–2006) and is a Research Associate for the National Bureau of Economic Research (since 1995).

Research
Aït-Sahalia's research has concentrated on the estimation of continuous-time models in financial economics. His primary contributions include the development of nonparametric methods for estimating and testing these models, of expansions to implement maximum-likelihood estimation of arbitrary models using discrete data, and numerous advances in the estimation and testing of models using high frequency data with a focus on understanding the role and importance of jumps.

Awards
Yacine Aït-Sahalia received fellowships from the Alfred P. Sloan Foundation (1998–1999) and the John Simon Guggenheim Memorial Foundation (2008–2009). He was elected a Fellow of the Econometric Society in 2002, of the Institute of Mathematical Statistics in 2004, of the American Statistical Association in 2008 and of the Society for Financial Econometrics in 2013. He is a Fellow of the Journal of Econometrics (1998).

He received awards for research excellence, including the Dennis J. Aigner Award (Journal of Econometrics, 2003), the FAME Annual Research Prize (2001), the Cornerstone Research Award (1998), the Michael J. Brennan Award (1997) and the Review of Economic Studies Tour (1993).

References

External links
 
 Bendheim Center for Finance website

MIT School of Humanities, Arts, and Social Sciences alumni
École Polytechnique alumni
Princeton University faculty
1966 births
Living people
Fellows of the Econometric Society
Fellows of the American Statistical Association
Economics journal editors
Econometricians